The term supply management, also called Procurement, describes the methods and processes of modern corporate or institutional buying. This may be for the purchasing of supplies for internal use referred to as indirect goods and services, purchasing raw materials for the consumption during the manufacturing process, or for the purchasing of goods for inventory to be resold as products in the distribution and retail process.

In many organizations, acquisition or buying of services is called contracting, while that of goods is called purchasing or procurement. The supply management function of an organization is responsible for various aspects of these acquisitions:
 Working with business leaders who have identified a business need or requirement to identify, source, contract, and procure the needed good or service from qualified suppliers
 Managing supplier performance
 Implementing technologies, processes, policies, and procedures to support the purchasing process (Supplier Relationship Management).
 The supplier relationship management process: a process for providing the structure for how relationships with suppliers will be developed and maintained.
 Economic theories of supply and demand

Supply management is generally regarded as a systematic business process that includes more functions than traditional buying, such as coordinating inbound and internal pre-production logistics and managing inventory.

Supply management deals primarily with the oversight and management of materials and services inputs, management of the suppliers who provide those inputs, and support of the process of acquiring those inputs.  The performance of supply management departments and supply management professionals is commonly measured in terms of amount of money saved for the organization.  However, managing risk is another aspect of supply management, with the risk of non-availability at the required time of quality goods and services for an organization's survival and growth.

Groups and certifications
Numerous professional organizations have formed to address the need for higher levels of supply management skill and expertise. One of the largest of these is the Institute for Supply Management, a United States not-for-profit association that includes more than 40,000 members. It is affiliated with the International Federation of Purchasing and Supply Management, a union of local and national purchasing associations with approximately 200,000 members.

For companies seeking to fulfill diversity supplier spend commitments, the National Minority Supplier Development Council with 37 affiliated regional councils, was established in 1972 to assist in promoting supplier development of Asian, Black, Hispanic and Native American-owned businesses, and providing management training and capacity-building to minority business enterprises and corporate program staff.

Many certification programs are relevant to the supply management profession.  Some are offered through non-profit associations, such as the Certified Professional in Supply Management (CPSM) through the Institute for Supply Management. There are also for-profit companies who offer certification programs, such as Next Level Purchasing Association, who offers the Senior Professional in Supply Management® (SPSM®) Certification.

Supply management is different from supply chain management, though it can be considered a component of supply chain management. Conversely, where the supply management function is established as a C-level strategic effort, supply chain management is but one component of an overall strategic supply management approach. Supply management is a complementary discipline that encompasses the alignment of organizations, processes, and systems for strategic sourcing, contract management, supplier management, spend analysis to continuously improve global supply for best-value performance in support of the strategic objectives of the business.

Supply management software

Supply management software comprises all of the different solutions which automate the source-to-settle process and include Spend Analysis, eSourcing, Contracts, Supply Base Management, eProcurement, eCatalogs (for Supplier Enablement), and Accounts Payable or ePayables solutions. Software which helps automate the management of complex services like business travel and temporary labor are also included in this software segment

One report that focuses on a sub-set of the space is a Gartner research report. Gartner estimates the sourcing software market at close to a half-billion dollars in 2007 with an annual growth rate of 5%.  Leading providers of supply and contract management software include SAP, Ariba, Zycus, GEP Worldwide, BravoSolution, Ivalua, Inc., AECsoft, Rosslyn Analytics and Emptoris.

Supply management is one of the processes included in procure-to-pay, source-to-pay, and similar ERP software implementations.

References

External links
 Supply Management magazine online

Procurement